El Producto is the third album by the American alternative rock band Walt Mink, released in 1996. On release, it received a 10/10 rating from Pitchfork Media.

The band promoted the album by touring with Fig Dish.

Critical reception

Trouser Press wrote: "Still one of the most imaginative extreme-guitar activists in pop, Kimbrough has likewise expanded his vocal repertoire, adding Beatlesque stylings and a middle register to tether the higher reaches of his eccentric stop-start-hold-rush phrasing." Spin determined that the album's "melodic guitar swirls, sharp syncopation, and helium-sucking vocals keep you guessing what's next." The Indianapolis Star concluded: "Switching fluidly between gentle and roaring tempos—sometimes in the same song—this trio reaches levels of melody-writing, energy and performance that are consistently, remarkably high."

Track listing
All songs written by John Kimbrough.
 "Stood Up" – 3:31
 "Everything Worthwhile" – 2:42
 "Betty" – 3:01
 "Overgrown" – 3:23
 "Settled" – 3:11
 "Me & My Dog" – 3:11
 "Little Sister" – 2:59
 "Up & Out" – 2:59
 "#246" – 3:20
 "Listen Up" – 2:27
 "Sunshine M." – 3:57
 "Love in the Dakota" – 3:58

Personnel 
John Kimbrough – guitar, vocals
Candice Belanoff – bass guitar, backing vocals
Orestes Morfin – drums, percussion, backing vocals
John Agnello – producer, engineer, mix
Keith Cleversley – mix
Wayne Dorell – assistant engineer
Juan Garcia – assistant engineer
Sue Kapa – assistant engineer
Greg Calbi – mastering
Ken Schles – photography

References

External links
 "Releases" page on Walt Mink's official site @ The Internet Archive (includes lyrics)

1996 albums
Walt Mink albums
Albums produced by John Agnello
Atlantic Records albums